The following is a list of awards and nominations received by Spin City, an American situation comedy which ran from September 17, 1996 until April 30, 2002, and was broadcast on ABC. During the show's six-year run, it received a number of various awards and nominations, including 3 Creative Arts Emmy awards nominations winning 1 in 2000 for Outstanding Cinematography for a Multi-Camera Series awarded to cinematographer Richard Quinlan, 10 Golden Globe award nominations winning 4 four Best Lead Actor in a Television Series - Comedy or Musical (awarded to 3 of 4 awarded to Michael J. Fox, 1 of 4 awarded to Charlie Sheen), 4 Primetime Emmy award nominations winning 1 in 2000 awarded to Fox for Outstanding Lead Actor in a Comedy Series, and 2 Screen Actors Guild awards for Outstanding Performance by a Male Actor in a Comedy Series awarded to Fox.

The show originally revolved around Deputy Mayor Michael Flaherty (Michael J. Fox), the deputy mayor of New York, who, together with his staff, tries to keep the town running. In 1998, Fox announced that he had Parkinson's disease, at first this wasn't such a big deal since a new character was introduced to help Mike with his work, but in 2000 Fox announced that he was going to quit the show, and was replaced by Charlie Sheen.

ALMA awards 

0 wins of 2 nominations

American Comedy awards 

0 wins of 2 nominations

ASCAP Film and Television Music awards 

1 win of 1 nomination

Casting Society awards 

1 win of 1 nomination

Creative Arts Emmy awards 

1 win of 4 nominations

Genesis awards 

1 win of 1 nomination

GLAAD Media awards 

1 win of 3 nominations

Golden Globe awards 

4 wins of 10 nominations

Image awards 

0 wins of 4 nominations

International Monitor awards 

1 win of 1 nominations

Nickelodeon Kid's Choice awards 

0 wins of 2 nominations

Online Film & Television Association awards 

X wins of X nominations

Primetime Emmy awards 

1 win of 4 nominations

Satellite awards 

0 wins of 5 nominations

Screen Actors Guild awards 

2 wins of 2 nominations

TV Guide awards 

0 wins of 2 nominations

References

External links
 Full List of Wins at The Internet Movie Database

Spin City
Spin City